The Junior Carlton Club  was a London gentlemen's club, now dissolved, which was established in 1864 and was disbanded in 1977.

History
Anticipating the forthcoming Second Reform Act under Benjamin Disraeli, numerous prospective electors decided to form a club closely aligned to the Conservative party. Adopting the model such other clubs as the Junior Athenaeum and the Junior Oxford and Cambridge Club, the Junior Carlton styled itself after the Carlton Club, which had a fixed number of members and a lengthy waiting list, and so was likely to remain out of the reach of these soon-to-be-enfranchised/newly enfranchised electors.

According to Anthony Lejeune, the Junior Carlton was the only one of the many clubs with the 'Junior' prefix to achieve anything of the prestige of the longer-standing, more established clubs which they sought to emulate.

Club building

From 1869, the club was housed in sumptuous premises at 30 Pall Mall designed by David Brandon, which it occupied well into the twentieth century. The club building was built by Lucas Brothers.

In the post-World War II era, the club was to be the victim of a planning decision by its ruling committee. The "senior" Carlton Club building at 94 Pall Mall had suffered a direct hit during the Blitz, and the site had proved difficult to sell for redevelopment. In 1963, the Junior Carlton's committee decided to proceed with the sale of the existing Junior Carlton building, and use part of the proceeds to purchase the site of the old Carlton. They opted to construct a bold new building described at the time as "the club of the future". The resulting concrete structure, luridly decorated to 1960s architectural tastes, opened in 1968 and is still in use today as an office building. It proved so unpopular with the membership of the time that many left, mainly joining the Carlton.

By 1977, the club was wound down and its few remaining members formally merged with the Carlton.

References

Citations

Further reading

See also
List of London's gentlemen's clubs

Gentlemen's clubs in London
Organizations established in 1864